The dakhanavar (դախանավար) is a vampire in Armenian folklore who protected the valley from intruders, first reported by Baron August von Haxthausen in his mid-19th century account of Armenia and Russian Transcaucasia, the book “Transcaucasia: Sketches of the Nations and Races Between the Black Sea and the Caspian”.  The Dakhanavar follows travelers until they stop for a rest, stalking their every move.  When they finally stop, the vampire attacks them in their sleep, typically going for their feet.  The local legend would often attack travelers in the night, sucking blood from their feet.  In one legend, he was outsmarted by two men who had already heard of the vampire's habits and slept with their feet under the other's head.  The vampire, thinking that they were one being with two heads and no feet, ran from the valley and was never heard from again.

The story of the Dakhanavar as documented by Haxthausen 

According to Jonathan Maberry’s“Vampire Universe: The Dark World of Supernatural Beings That Haunt Us, Hunt Us and Hunger for Us”:

“The Dakhanavar is ferociously territorial and will assault anyone who tries to make a map of its lands, or even count the hills and valleys in the region, correctly fearing that a thorough knowledge of the landscape would reveal all of its secret hiding places.
Even today some travelers in Armenia, particularly those going into the region of Mount Ararat, generally take precautions against evil beings such as Dakhanvar. Often, they put small cloves of raw garlic in various pockets or mash it up and rub the paste on their shoes. At night, if camping out of doors, these travelers build a large fire and toss garlic bulbs into the flames. The combination of garlic aroma and a blazing fire will drive almost all of the world’s many species of vampires away.”

References 

Vampires
Armenian folklore